Dust mite allergy, also known as house dust allergy, is a sensitization and allergic reaction to the droppings of house dust mites. The allergy is common and can trigger allergic reactions such as asthma, eczema or itching. The mite's gut contains potent digestive enzymes (notably peptidase 1) that persist in their feces and are major inducers of allergic reactions such as wheezing. The mite's exoskeleton can also contribute to allergic reactions. Unlike scabies mites or skin follicle mites, house dust mites do not burrow under the skin and are not parasitic.

The symptoms can be avoided or alleviated by a number of measures. In general, cutting down mite numbers may reduce these reactions while others say efforts to remove these mites from the environment have not been found to be effective. Immunotherapy may be useful in those affected. Subcutaneous injections have better evidence than under the tongue dosing. Topical steroids as nasal spray or inhalation may be used.

Severe dust mite infestation in the home has been linked to atopic dermatitis, and epidermal barrier damage has been documented.

Symptoms 
Dust mite allergy symptoms include:

 Cough
 Facial pressure and pain
 Itchy, red or watery eyes
 Itchy nose, roof of the mouth or throat
 Nasal congestion
 Postnasal drip
 Runny nose, sneezing
 Swollen, blue-colored skin under the eyes

If the dust mite allergy contributes to asthma:

 Audible whistling or wheezing sound when exhaling
 Bouts of coughing or wheezing that are worsened by a respiratory virus such as a cold or the flu
 Chest tightness or pain
 Difficulty breathing
 Trouble sleeping caused by shortness of breath, coughing or wheezing

Cross-reactivity to shellfish allergy
Tropomyosin, the major allergen in dust mites, is also responsible for shellfish allergy. Exposure to inhaled tropomyosins from dust mites is thought to be the primary sensitizer for shellfish allergy, an example of inhalant-to-food cross-reactivity. Epidemiological surveys have confirmed correlation between shellfish and dust mite sensitizations. An additional confirmation was seen in Orthodox Jews with no history of shellfish consumption, in that skin tests confirming dust mite allergy were also positive for shellfish tropomyosin. In addition to tropomyosin, the proteins arginine kinase and hemocyanin seem to have a role in cross-reactivity to dust mites.

Prevention

Furniture

Furniture with wooden or leather surfaces reduces the dust mite population.

Bed linen

Hot tumble drying a bed linen for 1 hour will kill 99% of mites therein.

Weekly changing the bed linen reduces the risk of exposure to dust mites.

Cotton covers not covered with complete mattress covers are very likely to become colonized by bacteria and molds; they must be cleaned periodically (at least every second to third month). Here, the dust mites are beneficial as they return cotton to its original state after it has degraded by contact with bare skin.

Dust mite eggs are freeze tolerant (−70 °C for 30 minutes); hatching can normally be prevented by exposure of fabrics to:
 Direct sunlight for 3 hours or
 Dry or wet heat of at least 60 °C (140 °F) for a minimum of 30 minutes.

Dust mites drown in water.

Good properties of anti-mite fabrics have been identified as being:
 Thread count greater than 246.
 Pore size of between 2 and 10 micrometres. This will prevent dust mite faecal pellets that can be small as 10 µm.
 Allergen impenetrability >99%.
 Dust leakage of less than 4%.
 Breathability between 2 and 6 cm3 s−1 cm−2.

Indoor climate
Allergy patients are advised to keep the relative humidity below 50%, if possible. Very few mites can survive if the humidity is less than 45% (at ). However, they can survive if the humidity is high just for an hour and a half per day, for example due to moisture released to the air when cooking food.

Treatment

Allergen immunotherapy 
Allergen immunotherapy (AIT, also known as desensitization or hypo-sensitization) is a treatment involved in administering the doses of allergens to accustom the body to substances that are generally harmless (pollen, house dust mites), thereby inducing specific long-term tolerance. Allergen immunotherapy is the only treatment that alters the disease mechanism.

Immunotherapy can be administered orally (as sublingual tablets or sublingual drops), or by injections under the skin (subcutaneous). Subcutaneous immunotherapy is the most common form and has the largest body of evidence supporting its effectiveness.

Subcutaneous Immunotherapy (SCIT) 
Subcutaneous Immunotherapy (SCIT) also known as Allergy Shots are series of shots/injections of the allergen given into the fat under the skin that have progressively larger amounts of allergen. These shots can be given to children as young as 5 years old.

Sublingual immunotherapy (SLIT) 
HDM-SLIT tablet, House Dust Mites (Dermatophagoides farinae and Dermatophagoides pteronyssinus) Allergen Extract (Trade-names: ODACTRA, ACARIZAX & MITICURE), is the only FDA approved allergen extract for the immunotherapic treatment of adolescents (12–17 years) and adults (18–65 years). It significantly treats house dust mite (HDM)-induced allergic rhinitis, with or without conjunctivitis. It has been approved in Japan, Russia, South-East Asia, Turkey, the Middle East, New Zealand and 14 European countries.

Further reading 
 List of mites associated with cutaneous reactions
 List of allergens
 House dust mite
 Allergy
 Asthma and Allergy Friendly
 Allergic rhinitis

References

External links 

 House Dust Mite Injection (Dermatophagoides Pteronyssinus): Uses, Dosage, Side Effects, Interactions, Warning

Allergology